Neoplynes eudora is a moth of the family Erebidae. It was described by Harrison Gray Dyar Jr. in 1894. It is found in Florida, Georgia, North Carolina and Texas.

The wingspan is about 24 mm. Adults have been recorded on wing year round.

References

 Arctiidae genus list at Butterflies and Moths of the World of the Natural History Museum

Phaegopterina
Moths described in 1894